Jacob's is a brand name for several lines of biscuits and crackers in the Republic of Ireland and the United Kingdom. The brand name is owned by the Jacob Fruitfield Food Group, part of Valeo Foods, which produces snacks for the Irish market. The brand name is used under licence by United Biscuits, part of Pladis.

History

The originator of the Jacob's brand name was the small biscuit bakery, W. & R. Jacob, founded in 1851 in Bridge Street, Waterford, Ireland, by William Beale Jacob and his brother Robert. It later moved to Bishop Street in Dublin, Ireland, with a factory in Peter's Row.  Jacob's Bishop Street premises was one of several prominent Dublin buildings occupied by rebels during the Easter Rising of 1916.

Jacob's first English factory was opened in 1914 in Aintree, Liverpool, and remains the primary producer of Jacob's products in the UK, including Cream Crackers and Twiglets. 

In 1922, a separate English company was formed, W. & R. Jacob (L'pool) Ltd.
The two branches separated, with the Dublin branch retaining the W. & R. Jacob name while the Liverpool branch was renamed Jacob's Bakery Ltd. In the 1970s, W. & R. Jacob in Dublin merged with Boland's Biscuits to form Irish Biscuits Ltd. and moved to Tallaght, a Dublin suburb. The Liverpool factory joined Associated Biscuits in 1960, which was purchased by Nabisco in 1982.

In 1990, the two companies once again came under common ownership and became Jacob's Biscuit Group when they were acquired by the French company Groupe Danone. In July 2004, Groupe Danone and United Biscuits announced that they had made an agreement for the latter to acquire Jacob's Biscuit Group. 
However, only days later, Groupe Danone, United Biscuits, and Fruitfield Foods announced that Jacob's Biscuit Group would be split, with United Biscuits acquiring only the UK portion of the Group and Fruitfield Foods acquiring the Republic of Ireland portion.
Fruitfield Foods was subsequently renamed the Jacob Fruitfield Food Group and is now part of the Valeo Food Group. Valeo Foods was established in September 2010 through the merger of Batchelors and Origin Foods.

Since their acquisitions, United Biscuits and Jacob Fruitfield Food Group have been in a legal dispute over the use of the Jacob's brand name.

With the acquisition of Groupe Danone's biscuit division by Kraft Foods in 2007, the production and sales of Jacob's biscuits in Malaysia are done through Mondelez Malaysia.

As of 2015, the Aintree factory produced over 55,000 tonnes of products each year, and as of 2022 4,000 tonnes of crackers are produced annually at the factory. In 2015, it received a £10 million investment from United Biscuits to further boost output.

Industrial relations

The activist and trade union organiser Rosie Hackett worked for some years as a messenger for Jacob's. At that time the working conditions in the factory were poor. On 22 August 1911 Hackett helped organise the withdrawal of women's labour in Jacob's factory to support their male colleagues who were already on strike. With the women's help, the men secured better working conditions and a pay rise. Two weeks later, at the age of eighteen, Hackett co-founded the Irish Women Worker's Union (IWWU) with Delia Larkin. During the 1913 Lockout Hackett helped mobilise the Jacob's workers to come out in solidarity with other workers, they in turn were locked out by their own employers. In 1914 her Jacob's employers sacked her over her role in the Lockout.

In 2009, after 156 years of making biscuits in Ireland, Jacob Fruitfield shut its Tallaght plant. 220 jobs were lost while the company retained around 100 staff in a variety of roles.

In November 2022, workers at the Aintree factory went on strike after pay negotiations with management since September of that year  failed to reach an agreement, and the company temporarily shifted production to Portugal. Staff at the factory are supported in the ongoing strike by the GMB union.

Products

Toppable crackers 
 Cream Crackers
 Biscuits For Cheese
Savoury Favourites
 Flatbreads
 Salt & Pepper
 Mixed Seeds
 Crispbreads
 Chive
 Mixed Seed
 Mixed Grain
 Ciabatta
 Sundried Tomato & Basil
 Original 
 Krackawheat 
 Choice Grain
 Sourdough 
 Butter Puffs
 Cornish Wafers
 High Fibre

Snackable crackers 
 Savours
 Salt and Pepper
 Sour Cream & Chive
 Cheese
 Sweet Chilli 
 Cheddars
 Pickle
 Cheese
Smoky BBQ

Mini Cheddars 

 Mini Cheddars Original 6 Pack
 Mini Cheddars Red Leicester 6 Pack 
 Mini Cheddars Smoky BBQ 6 Pack
 Mini Cheddars Nacho Cheese & Jalapeño 
 Mini Cheddars Chipotle Chicken Wings
 Mini Cheddars Lime & Chilli
Mini Cheddars Strathdon Blue Cheese
Mini Cheddars Dragon's Breath Chilli Cheddar
Mini Cheddars Ploughman's Cheshire Cheese

Mini Cheddars Sticks 
 Rich & Tangy Cheddar
 Grilled Cheddar & Sizzling Steak

Cracker Crisps 
 Salt & Vinegar 
 Sour Cream & Chive
 Sour Cream & Chive Caddies

Crinklys 
 Variety Pack (6 Pack including 2 × Cheese & Onion, 2 × Chilli Beef and 2 × Salt & Vinegar)
Cheese & Onion 6 Pack

Twiglets 

 Twiglets Multipack
 Twiglets Caddies

Cheeselets 
 Cheeselets Caddies
 Cheeselets 125g

See also
Jacob's Awards

References

Further reading 

National Archives of Ireland article "Jacob's Biscuit Factory, 1916"

External links
 
Official website  (United Kingdom)

United Biscuits brands
Brand name snack foods